Lady Agnes Stewart (died 1557) was a Scottish noble. She was born the illegitimate daughter of James Stewart, 1st Earl of Buchan and Margaret Murray. On 31 October 1552 she was legitimized, confirmed by Queen Mary of Guise under the Great Seal of Scotland.

Marriages 

Lady Agnes Stewart married first Adam Hepburn, 2nd Earl of Bothwell in August 1511 (killed at the Battle of Flodden on 9 September 1513), secondly Alexander Home, 3rd Lord Home (executed on 8 October 1516), thirdly Robert Maxwell, 5th Lord Maxwell (died 9 July 1546), and fourthly Cuthbert Ramsay, a burgess of Edinburgh, who survived her. She died in February, 1557.

Agnes Stewart was known as Lady Bothwell, or the Countess of Bothwell after her first marriage; as Lady Home during her second marriage; as Lady Maxwell during her third marriage. During her marriage to Cuthbert Ramsay she used one of her previous titles. Women in early modern Scotland did not use their husband's surnames after marriage.

In December 1520, Margaret Tudor, the widow of James IV of Scotland who had married the Earl of Angus, granted Agnes Stewart the forest stead lands of Tinnis and the tower and place of Tynnis, with the adjacent forest stead of Deuchar.

Children 
Children of Lady Agnes Stewart and Adam Hepburn, 2nd Earl of Bothwell include: 
 Patrick Hepburn, 3rd Earl of Bothwell b. abt 1511 - 1513, d. Sep 1556

Children of Lady Agnes Stewart and Alexander Home, 3rd Lord Home include:
 Janet Home, married John Hamilton of Samuelston (aka Clydesdale John), illegitimate son of James Hamilton, 1st Earl of Arran

References

Year of birth missing
1557 deaths
16th-century Scottish people
Daughters of Scottish earls
Bothwell
Ladies of Parliament